Israel "El" Gabriel (23 October 1944 - 8 December 2020) was a Filipino dancer and choreographer resident in Los Angeles. Guide to the Israel Gabriel Papers MS.P.052 ... personal papers documenting the career and academic work of choreographer, dancer, and University of California, Irvine dance instructor Israel "El" Gabriel."</ref>

References

1944 births
Filipino male dancers
Living people